MŽRKL League for the season 2015–16 was the fifteenth season of the Adriatic League. Competition included eleven teams from six countries. In this season participating clubs from Serbia, Montenegro, Bosnia and Herzegovina, Croatia, Slovenia and from Macedonia. MŽRKL League for the season 2015–16 has begun to play 8 October 2015. and ended on 10 February 2016, when he it was completed a League 6. Final Four to be played from 12–13 March 2016.

Team information

Regular season
In the Regular season was played with 11 teams divided into 2 groups of 5/6 teams and play a dual circuit system, each with one game each at home and away. The three best teams in each group at the end of the regular season were placed in the League 6. The regular season began on 7 October 2015. and it will end on 23 December 2015.

Group A

Group B

League 6

In the League 6 was played with  6 teams and play a dual circuit system, each with one game each at home and away. The four best teams in League 6 at the end of the last round were placed on the Final Four. The regular season began on 28 December 2015. and it will end on 11 February 2016.

Classification 7–12

Classification 7–12 of the MŽRKL took place between 27 January 2016 and it will end on 10 February 2016.

Seventh place game

Ninth place game

 Partizan which was supposed to play in the MŽRKL in the group B withdrew from the competition and the last placed team in Group A will automatically take 11 place.

Final four

Final Four to be played from 12–13 March 2016, in the Morača Sports Center in Podgorica, Montenegro.

Awards
Final Four MVP: Irena Matović (186-F-88) of  Budućnost Bemax
Player of the Year: Nina Premasunac (186-F/C-92) of  Medveščak
Guard of the Year: Sanja Mandić (178-SG-95) of  Radivoj Korać
Forward of the Year: Irena Matović (186-F-88) of  Budućnost Bemax
Center of the Year: Nina Premasunac (186-F/C-92) of  Medveščak
Defensive Player of the Year: Živa Zdolšek (178-F/G-89) of  Triglav Kranj
Most Improved Player of the Year: Božica Mujović (178-G-96) of  Budućnost Bemax
Newcomer of the Year: Patricija Bura (188-C-96) of  Medveščak
Coach of the Year: Goran Bošković of  Budućnost Bemax

1st Team
PG: Sanja Mandić (178-SG-95) of  Radivoj Korać
SG: Jovana Popović (173-PG-90) of  Budućnost Bemax
F: Irena Matović (186-F-88) of  Budućnost Bemax
PF/C: Nina Premasunac (186-F/C-92) of  Medveščak
C: Nataša Popović (192-C-82) of  Čelik Zenica

2nd Team
PG: Božica Mujović (178-G-96) of  Budućnost Bemax
SG: Iva Borović (170-G-88) of  Medveščak
G/F: Živa Zdolšek (178-F/G-89) of  Triglav Kranj
F/PF: Tamara Kapor (184-G-91) of  Budućnost Bemax
C: Vladinka Erak (192-C-84) of  Radivoj Korać

All-Defensive Team
G: Ebone Henry (178-G/F-91) of  Budućnost Bemax
G/F: Živa Zdolšek (178-F/G-89) of  Triglav Kranj
F: Tamara Kapor (184-G-91) of  Budućnost Bemax
PF: Nina Premasunac (186-F/C-92) of  Medveščak
C: Nataša Popović (192-C-82) of  Čelik Zenica

Honorable Mention
Nataša Bučevac (179-F-85) of  Radivoj Korać
Lea Miletić (183-F-95) of  Kvarner
Monika Tomljenović (180-G-85) of  Kvarner
Ivana Dojkić (180-SG-97) of  Athlete Celje
Nikolina Babić (177-G-95) of  Play Off Happy
Nikolina Džebo (186-C-95) of  Play Off Happy
Branka Luković (190-PF-95) of  UCAM Jairis

External links
 Official website
 2015–16 MŽRKL at eurobasket.com

 
2015-16
2015–16 in European women's basketball leagues
2015–16 in Serbian basketball
2015–16 in Bosnia and Herzegovina basketball
2015–16 in Montenegrin basketball
2015–16 in Slovenian basketball
2015–16 in Republic of Macedonia basketball
2015–16 in Croatian basketball